The Bushveld Classic was a golf tournament that was formerly played in the Sunshine Tour. The list of winners starts from 1991, but there may have been more past playings of the event.

Winners
1997  Desvonde Botes
1996  James Kingston
1995  Kevin Stone
1994  Don Gammon
1993  Kevin Stone
1992  Retief Goosen
1991  John Mashego

References

Former Sunshine Tour events